Gally may refer to:

People
 Francis Gally (1863-1918) French actor
 Henry Gally (1696-1769) British academic
 Henry Gally Knight (1786-1846) British writer
 John Gally Knight (1741-1804) British politician

Fictional characters
 Gally, aka Alita; main character of Gunnm (Battle Angel Alita), see List of Battle Angel Alita characters#Gally/Alita
Gally, a fictional character in The Maze Runner book series, played by Will Poulter in the film series of the same name.

Other uses
 Galley, alternately spelled as "gally"; a type of boat/ship

See also

 
 
 
 Galley (disambiguation)
 Galle (disambiguation)
 Galli (disambiguation)
 Gal (disambiguation)